Federal Ministry of Finance may refer to:

 Federal Ministry of Finance (Brazil)
 Federal Ministry of Finance (Germany)
 Federal Ministry of Finance (Nigeria)